The Oblisco Capitale is a proposed megatall skyscraper in the New Administrative Capital of Egypt. It was announced in 2018 as a part of Egypt Vision 2030, aiming to become the world's tallest structure at a height of 1000 m .

The Oblisco Capitale project is designed by the Egyptian architectural design firm IDIA, which is based in Giza, Egypt. It is designed in the form of a Pharaonic obelisk surrounded by a water channel resembling the Nile River. As proposed, Oblisco Capitale is planned to have 165 floors, which includes residences, hotel apartments and units of various sizes. The proposal also includes several hotels, shopping malls, cinemas, housing, recreational centers, commercial centers, and medical centers.

Location 

The Oblisco Capitale is planned to be located in the central business district of the New Administrative Capital, near the Central Ring Road.

Design 

The tower's architecture is inspired from both the Pharaonic and Art Deco styles. The proportions of the Oblisco Capitale reference those of Ancient Egyptian obelisk. The design contains louvres – inspired by the Art Deco style – which rotate according to the sun's inclination, reducing heat throughout the day. The Nile River is represented in the project's design via the canal that connects the corners of land in the project.

The pattern on the tower's facade is inspired from the Egyptian lotus flower design used in the Pharaonic era; a flower that has grown along the Nile in Egypt for millennia and is widely known to have played a big part in the Ancient Egyptian civilization.

References

Proposed buildings and structures in Egypt
Proposed skyscrapers